The Legislative Council of Brunei (Malay: Majlis Mesyuarat Negara Brunei; Jawi: مجليس مشوارت نڬارا بروني; abbrev: Legco) is a national unicameral legislature of Brunei. The council comprises 36 appointed members, that only has consultative tasks. Under Brunei's 1959 constitution, His Majesty Hassanal Bolkiah is the head of state with full executive authority, including emergency powers since 1962. The Council holds its sitting annually in March at Legislative Council Building in Bandar Seri Begawan.

History
The council was established in 1959 by virtue of Article 23 of Brunei's Constitution of 1959. The 1959 constitution included five advisory bodies, including a Legislative Council, and granted the sultan full executive authority. When the left-wing Brunei People's Party (BPP), which aspired to overthrow the monarchy, gained all 10 of the council's elected seats in 1962, Sultan Omar Ali Saifuddien III invalidated the results. Its first sitting was held at Lapau on 21 October 1959.

Following the nation's first election on 30 and 31 August 1962, the Legislative Council's initial meeting was held on 10 October 1962. Part of the constitutional rules governing general elections were suspended in 1962, and members' seats were filled by royal appointment beginning on 28 August 1963. Sultan Hassanal Bolkiah dissolved the council on the following day. The inaugural meeting of the council took place on 27 December 1983, and it was disbanded on 13 February 1984. Hence, legislative powers were fully vested in the Sultan.

After a 21-year hiatus, the Sultan reconvened on 25 September 2004, with the proposed modification to the 1959 constitution as its first item on the agenda. The Council approved a constitutional proposal that would have increased its size to 45 seats, 15 of which would be elected. The Sultan disestablished the council on 1 September 2005 and, on the following day, reestablished the Council based on the amended version of Brunei's Constitution. Five members of the new Legislative Council, who were indirectly elected to represent village councils, were appointed by the Sultan in September 2005. In 2006 and 2007, plans for a 45-member legislature with 15 seats up for public vote were still on the table, but elections were still not scheduled by year's end. All state authority remains in the hands of the sultan's family and chosen successors, and the Internal Security Act (ISA) keeps the sultan's personal authority largely untouched. 

The Legislative Council met in 2006 and 2007 to examine government spending, suggesting that it has adopted budget review as a regular duty in recent years. The plans for elected Council members, Brunei's 2006 membership in the Asian Development Bank, and government initiatives to promote the private sector while combating corruption and radical Islam are all considered preparations for the anticipated depletion of the nation's oil and gas reserves, which currently make up 90% of state revenues. This modest increase in Council activity and increased focus on government spending are all part of these preparations. With the money, the government has long been able to stave off calls for political reform by keeping the majority of the populace in work, lavishing them with benefits, and exempting them from paying income tax. 

A member of the Council asked information from the second finance minister of the nation during a meeting in March 2007 regarding government investment organizations like the Workers Trust Fund and the Brunei Investment Agency (BIA). The Minister of Home Affairs, a member of the sultan's appointed cabinet, urged for prudent use of the national budget in April in yet another sporadic appeal for accountability. On 6 March 2007, the Sultan gave his permission to be present at the International Convention Centre in Berakas for the opening ceremony of the first sitting of the Legislative Council's third session. Additionally present were Prince Mohamed Bolkiah, Minister of Foreign Affairs and Commerce, and Prince Al-Muhtadee Billah, Crown Prince and Senior Minister in the Prime Minister's Office. The People's Awareness Party (PAKAR) was completely disbanded, and the president of the Brunei National Solidarity Party (PPKB) was forced to resign. In addition, the government's Registrar of Societies tightened its supervision over political party activity in 2007.

The first meeting of the fourth session of the Legislative Council began on 4 March 2008 at the new building in Jalan Kebangsaan. The Sultan officiated the grand opening by signing a plaque shortly after receiving the Royal Salute and inspecting the guard of honour by the personnel of the Royal Brunei Police Force (RBPF).

Roles
Since 1959, the council has played significant roles towards Brunei; not only to consider and approve budgets and revenue estimates, but also to advise the Sultan on the drive of the Government, to review policies implemented by the Government and to pass bills and motions brought by the Government and other members of the council.

Legislative procedure
The Council follows the practice of other Commonwealth parliaments. All bills presented in the Council go through three readings. All bills, however, must obtain prior approval from the Cabinet prior to their presentation in the council. Once a bill is passed, a bill must obtain Royal Assent in order to turn such bill to an Act.

Speakers of Legislative Council

Membership
The Council comprises the Sultan, the Crown Prince, cabinet ministers and three types of members: members with titles, members representing districts, and members among outstanding Bruneians. All members, other than the Sultan, are appointed by the Sultan in accordance with Article 24 of Brunei Constitution. The rest of the deputies outside of the cabinet, which are deputies ex-officio of the LegCo, are appointed for five year terms.

The subsequent list as below are returning members of LegCo appointed by Sultan on 20 January 2023 as announced in Borneo Bulletin.

Cabinet ministers 
Since 7 June 2022 (a reshuffling of the Cabinet which had served since 30 January 2018), the Council consists of the following ex-officio deputies:

Titled and clergy persons

Functional seats 
Pursuant to Second Schedule of Article 24 (1) (a) (iii), these seats given for persons who have achieved distinction on their own professional field or good contribution for communities across Brunei.

District representatives 
These deputies of the districts are appointed by the Sultan among those village heads and penghulu of townships (mukim), which since the 2010s are elected directly by the people of their areas.

Legislative Council Building 
Since achieving independence, this is the first time that the nation held the council meeting at the new grand parliament building on 4 March 2008, the construction for which began in March 2005 under the 8th National Development Plan. Three blocks make up the structure. In addition to office space and a conference room, the building has a banquet hall, library, meeting rooms, auditorium, surau, gym, VIP rooms, and canteen. It also has a parade ground in front of the building, parking, a landscaped area, and a three-acre lake. Judin Asar, the council's clerk, claimed that the new structure would help the council carry out its mission to provide better services to the government and country, particularly those pertaining to the privy council, legislative council, and cabinet ministers meetings.

See also
Politics of Brunei
List of legislatures by country

References

External links 
 

 
1959 establishments in Brunei
Government of Brunei
Brunei
Brunei
Brunei